Sasuli (also Romanized as Sāsūlī; also known as Shahrak-e Sāsūlī) is a village in Jahanabad Rural District, in the Central District of Hirmand County, Sistan and Baluchestan Province, Iran. At the 2006 census, its population was 600, in 122 families.

References 

Populated places in Hirmand County